Stanford Jazz Workshop (SJW) is a nonprofit organization dedicated to jazz education and the annual concert series known as the Stanford Jazz Festival.

SJW was founded in 1972 by saxophonist and educator Jim Nadel. Though many of its activities are held on the campus, SJW is neither legally nor financially connected to Stanford University.

About 

SJW includes a Jazz Camp for musicians ages 12–17; Jazz Institute for adults and advanced youth; and the Evening Summer Program. SJW annually awards more than 100 Jazz Camp tuition scholarships to youth with financial need.

The students and artists who have participated in the Stanford Jazz Workshop and Festival number more than 10,000 and represent countries from around the world.

External links
Stanford Jazz Workshop
Stanford Jazz Festival
Jazz Workshop Students Learning From the Pros - article in San Francisco Chronicle, 08.04.00
 Teacher's Pet: Those who can do, teach, is the theme of the 2006 Stanford Jazz Festival - article in San Jose Metro

Jazz organizations
Jazz music education
Music education in the United States
Educational institutions established in 1972
Stanford University
Tourist attractions in Santa Clara County, California
1972 establishments in California
Music of the San Francisco Bay Area